Duck is a 2005 American drama film by director-writer-producer Nic Bettauer.  It stars Philip Baker Hall.  The film is a dystopian view of the then-near future of 2009.

Plot
Following the death of his wife, Arthur Pratt (Philip Baker Hall) is on the verge of taking his own life.  However, after he has finished burying his wife's ashes at a nearby park, a duckling crosses his path.  Noticing that the duckling is all alone, Arthur decides to help it find its brace.  Unfortunately, they find its brace has been killed while crossing a road.  In sympathy, Arthur then takes the surviving duckling to his apartment, where he bathes and feeds it.  No longer on the verge of suicide, Arthur commits himself to raising and taking care of the duckling, whom he names “Joe.”

After falling behind on his rent and because his retirement home doesn't allow pets, Arthur is evicted from his apartment and banned from the premises.  Arthur returns with Joe to the park where they first met and is "transformed" into a full-grown duck.  There, Arthur picks up the litter he finds and offers it to a garbage collector (Noel Gugliemi), who informs him that the park is used as a landfill and will soon become a construction site for a shopping mall.

Workers from a septic and sewage service arrive to drain the pond on which they are living.  They try to chase Joe away, but Joe hasn't learned to fly.  The workers then start throwing rocks etc. at Joe, and Arthur comes to his rescue.  Following a quarrel with the workers, the fire department, members of a psychological evaluation team, the city's animal control and finally the police, Arthur and Joe leave the park for good and set out on a new journey.

During their wandering, Arthur and Joe cross paths with a variety of  Los Angeles denizens, including: Norman (Bill Cobbs), a blind man on his way to the beach and his guide dog Trisha; Leopold (Bill Brochtrup), a homeless man to whom Arthur gives a pair of socks; a man (French Stewart) who is also on the verge of suicide because he knows his girlfriend is having an affair with his best friend; and a pedicurist (Amy Hill) whose husband was killed in Vietnam and who has moved to the US looking for a better life for herself and her daughter.

Joe and Arthur make their way to a bridge where Arthur decides it may be best that they go their separate ways. Joe doesn't want to  part from Arthur, but Arthur leaves him anyway. Joe then jumps off the bridge, and quacks in fright upon landing on the creek. Noticing the creek is full of toxic waste, Arthur once again rescues Joe. Arthur apologizes to Joe for abandoning him, telling him "I'd die without you, Joe."

Arthur and Joe finally arrive at the beach and are reunited with their acquaintances Norman and Trisha. The film ends as the four of them walk companionably along the shore.

Cast
 Philip Baker Hall as Arthur Pratt
 Bill Brochtrup as Leopold
 Amy Hill as Pedicurist
 Noel Gugliemi as Lord of the Garbage
 Larry Cedar as Mr. Janney
 French Stewart as Jumper
 Bill Cobbs as Norman

According to The Boston Globe, Joe is portrayed by the Aflac duck.

Reception
Rotten Tomatoes, a review aggregator, reports that 50% of 18 surveyed critics gave the film a positive review; the average rating is 5.3/10.  Metacritic rated it 53/100 based on seven reviews.  Lisa Nesselson of Variety called it "a small, affecting road movie peopled with sharp vignettes".  Michael Rechtshaffen of The Hollywood Reporter wrote, "Bettauer has a lot of serious things to put across about survival in the big, unfeeling metropolis, and while her modern-day fable obviously has Capra-esque intentions, the maudlin results cry out for a better focused, more sharply executed plan of attack."  Gary Goldstein at reel.com rated it 1.5 stars, saying "Duck is a turkey" and "Bettauer's made a tedious, groan-worthy picture notable only for the bigger issues it attempts—and fails—to successfully explore than for any real entertainment value." The New York Times said "it tries too hard" and "ducks aren't all that endearing". Mark Feeney in the Boston Globe said that Bettauer "strikes a very uneasy balance" between playing for tears or laughs.

References

External links

2005 films
2005 drama films
American drama films
American independent films
Films about ducks
Films about homelessness
Films about suicide
Films set in Los Angeles
2005 independent films
Films scored by Alan Lazar
2000s English-language films
2000s American films